Spencer E. Wishart (December 3, 1889 – August 22, 1914) was an American racecar driver. He was active during the early years of the Indianapolis 500.

Biography
He was born on December 3, 1889, in Philadelphia, Pennsylvania.

Wishart was killed on August 22, 1914, at age 24 when he clipped another car during a 1914 AAA Championship Car season race in Elgin, Illinois. He crashed into a tree. Spencer Wishart is interred at Kensico Cemetery in Valhalla, New York.

Indy 500 results

Images

References

1889 births
1914 deaths
Indianapolis 500 drivers
Racing drivers who died while racing
Sports deaths in Illinois
Racing drivers from Philadelphia
Burials at Kensico Cemetery